are traditional Japanese confections that are often served with green tea, especially the types made of mochi, anko (azuki bean paste), and fruit. Wagashi are typically made from plant-based ingredients.

History

In Japan, the word for sweets, originally referred to fruits and nuts. With the increasing sugar trade between China and Japan, sugar became a common household ingredient by the end of the Muromachi period. Influenced by the introduction of tea and dim sum, the creation of wagashi took off during the Edo period in Japan.

Types

 Akumaki: one of the confections of Kagoshima Prefecture
 Anmitsu: chilled agar jelly cubes (kanten) served with sweet red bean paste and fruit
 Amanattō: simmered azuki beans or other beans with sugar, and dried—amanattō and nattō are not related, although the names are similar.
 Botamochi: a sweet rice ball wrapped with anko (or an, thick azuki bean paste)
 Daifuku: general term for mochi (pounded sweet rice) stuffed with anko
 Dango: a small, sticky, sweet Japanese dumpling, commonly skewered on a stick
 Domyoji: wagashi made with anko (red beans) wrapped in sticky rice
 Dorayaki: a round, flat sweet consisting of castella wrapped around anko
 Gokabou:  a sweetened cake made of rice and mixed with sugar 
 Hanabiramochi: a flat, red and white, sweet mochi wrapped around anko and a strip of candied gobo (burdock), shaped like a flower petal
 Ikinari dango: a steamed bun with a chunk of sweet potato and anko in the center, it is a local confectionery in Kumamoto.
 Imagawayaki (also kaitenyaki): anko surrounded in a disc of fried dough covering
 Kompeito: crystal sugar candy
 Kusa mochi: "grass" mochi, a sweet mochi infused with Japanese mugwort (yomogi), surrounding a center of anko
 Kuzumochi
 Kuri kinton: a sweetened mixture of boiled and mashed chestnuts
 Manjū: steamed cakes of an surrounded by a flour mixture, available in many shapes such as peaches, rabbits, and matsutake (松茸) mushrooms
 Mochi: a rice cake made of glutinous rice
 Monaka: a center of anko sandwiched between two delicate and crispy sweet rice crackers
 Oshiruko (also zenzai): a hot dessert made from anko in a liquid, soup form, with small mochi floating in it
 Rakugan: a small, very solid and sweet cake which is made of rice flour and mizuame
 Sakuramochi: a rice cake filled with anko and wrapped in a pickled cherry leaf
 Taiyaki: like a  imagawayaki, a core of anko surrounded by a fried dough covering, but shaped like a fish
 Uirō: a steamed cake made of rice flour and sugar, similar to mochi
 Warabimochi: traditionally made from warabi and served with kinako and kuromitsu
 Yatsuhashi: thin sheets of gyūhi (sweetened mochi), available in different flavors, like cinnamon, and occasionally folded in a triangle around a ball of red anko
 Yōkan: one of the oldest wagashi, a solid block of anko, hardened with agar and additional sugar
 Yubeshi

Classification
Wagashi are classified according to the production method and moisture content. Moisture content is very important, since it affects shelf life.

  (wet confectionery)—contains 30% or more moisture
  is a very soft and delicate, seasonally varying namagashi, in various, often elaborate, shapes and colors, often reflecting seasonal plants. Some stores will have many dozens over the course of a year.
 
  (steamed confectionery)
  (baked confectionery)
 (Flat pan baked confectionery)
 　(oven　baked confectionery)
 
 
  (fried confectionery)
  (half-wet confectionery)—contains 10%–30% moisture
 
 
  (baked confectionery)
 (Flat pan baked confectionery)
 　(oven　baked confectionery)
 
 
  (dry confectionery)—contains 10% or less moisture
 
 
 
  (baked confectionery)
  (candy confectionery)

Characteristics
Making wagashi typically takes a lot of work. They are usually named after poetry, historical events, or natural scenery.

Wagashi are known for their delicateness and variety in appearance, reflecting the delicacy culture of Japan.

They can be used as a gift during festivals, and can also be a daily treat for visiting guests. Different places have wagashi that are unique in flavor as their local specialty. Japanese people tend to take wagashi back home after business trips or personal trips.

Many Japanese believe that the artistic characteristics of wagashi represent both the season when the wagashi are made and the humble culture of Japan.

See also

 Chinese desserts – Chinese confections
 Hangwa – Korean confections
 Bánh – Vietnamese sweet or savoury snacks and confections 
 Turkish delight – Turkish confections
 List of Japanese desserts and sweets
 List of Japanese snacks

References

External links
 
 Japan Wagashi Association 

 
Chadō
Tea culture